= Miguel Aguilera =

Colombian linguist

Miguel Aguilera (1895–1973) was a Colombian linguist. He was a founding member of the Instituto Colombiano de Cultura Hispánica, and is noted for critical works such as América en los Clásicos Españoles and Raíces lejanas de la Independencia.
